Krishna Bhakthi is a 1949 Tamil-language historical musical film, directed by R. S. Mani, and produced by S. N. Laxmana Chettiar. The film stars P. U. Chinnappa and T. R. Rajakumari as a hypocrite saint and chaste court dancer respectively. Inspired by Matthew Lewis' French novel The Monk, it was released on 14 January 1949.

Plot 
Harikanandha Bhagavathar is a hypocrite saint who lusts after a chaste court dancer Devakumari.

Cast 
Male cast according to the opening credits of the film and female cast according to the song book

Male cast
 P. U. Chinnappa as Harikanandha Bhagavathar
 N. S. Krishnan as Vevukarar
 K. R. Ramasami as Shri Krishnan
 Chithambaram Jayaraman as Naradar
 Pullimoottai Ramasami as Neebhushanam, Rajaguru
 D. Balasubramaniam as Narasimhan
 Azhwar Kuppusami as Alwar
 Kulathu Mani
 C. S. Pandian
 T. V. Namasivayam
 K. R. Chellamuthu
 E. Krishnamoorthi
 S. V. S. Narayanan
 T. V. Sivanandam
 Chandrasekharan
 S. Ramanathan
 T. V. Radhakrishnan
 V. Srinivasa Rao
 C. P. Venkateswaran
 Thirupathi
 S. S. Mani
 A. K. Kaleeswaran

Female cast
 T. R. Rajakumari as Devakumari, Palace Dasi
 T. A. Mathuram as Vevukarar's Wife
 S. P. L. Dhanalaskhmi as Vasumathi, Rajaguru's Wife
 P. A. Periyanayaki as Bhama
 A. R. Sakunthala as Rukmani
 C. T. Rajakantham as Ragamanjari, Old Mother
 M. L. Vasanthakumari as Singer
 Kumari N. Rajam as Mridangam Player
 C. V. Dhanalakshmi as Yazh Player
 T. D. Kusalakumari as Women Dancer
 P. Padma as Women Dancer
 K. S. Lakshmi as Geetham Singer
 M. K. Saroja as Thillana Dancer
 C. R. Rajakumari as Thillana Dancer
 K. S. Rajam as Women Dancer
 K. S. Chandra as Women Dancer
 Kumari Vanaja as Women Dancer
 R. Saraswathi as Women Dancer
 S. Rajeswari as Women Dancer
 S. Padma as Women Dancer
 Kumari Seetha as Beggar Girl

Production 
S. Ramanathan, an assistant of director R. S. Mani, bought a copy of the English translation of Matthew Lewis' French novel The Monk at Moore Market for one rupee. Subsequently, Mani began writing his next film Krishna Bhakthi taking inspiration from this novel. While Mani was credited for the story, the dialogues were written by S. D. S. Yogi, Shuddhananda Bharati, Ku. Pa. Sedhu Ammal and Sandilyan. Work on the script lasted more than six months, and the protagonist played by P. U. Chinnappa was based on the Russian mystic Grigori Rasputin. The film was produced by S. N. Laxmana Chettiar under Krishna Pictures. M. L. Vasanthakumari appeared onscreen as a singer, and Krishna Bhakthi was the only film she ever acted in.

Soundtrack 
Music was composed by S. V. Venkatraman and Kunnakudi Venkatarama Iyer and lyrics were written by Udumalai Narayana Kavi. The song "Saarasam Vaseegara" was composed by G. Ramanathan. Kunnakudi Venkatarama Iyer composed music for the song "Kannan Varuvarodi", to which dance was choreographed by Vazhuvoor B. Ramaiah Pillai. He also composed music for "Thamarai Senkann" and "Entha Vedu". The song "Entha Vedu Kontha O Raagavaa" is set in the raga Saraswathi Manohari.

Release and reception 
Krishna Bhakthi was released on 14 January 1949. The Indian Express wrote, "P. U. Chinnappa as the wily Rajaguru does credit to his reputation as top male star of the day. T. R. Rajakumari as the charming and ingenuous Rajanartaki gives a convincing performance". The Hindu wrote, "Krishna Bhakthi should have a very popular run for several weeks for more reasons than one. The theme has been handled in a very dignified and telling manner." The Mail wrote, "The drab found in most Tamil mythological pictures is completely eliminated in Krishna Bakthi".

References

External links 

1940s historical musical films
1940s Tamil-language films
1949 films
Films about Hinduism
Films about rape in India
Films based on French novels
Films scored by S. V. Venkatraman
Films scored by Kunnakudi Venkatarama Iyer
Hindu devotional films
Indian black-and-white films
Indian historical musical films
Krishna in popular culture